The Sikorsky Ilya Muromets (Sikorsky S-22, S-23, S-24, S-25, S-26 and S-27) were a class of Russian pre-World War I large four-engine commercial airliners and military heavy bombers used during  World War I by the Russian Empire.  The aircraft series was named after Ilya Muromets, a hero from Slavic mythology.  The series was based on the Russky Vityaz or Le Grand, the world's first four-engined aircraft, designed by Igor Sikorsky.  The Ilya Muromets aircraft as it appeared in 1913 was a revolutionary design, intended for commercial service with its spacious fuselage incorporating a passenger saloon and washroom on board. The Ilya Muromets was the world's first multi-engine aircraft in production and at least sixty were built. During World War I, it became the first four-engine bomber to equip a dedicated strategic bombing unit. This heavy bomber was unrivaled in the early stages of the war, as the Central Powers had no aircraft capable enough to rival it until much later.

Design and development 

The Ilya Muromets (Sikorsky S-22) was designed and constructed by Igor Sikorsky at the  Russo-Baltic Carriage Factory (RBVZ) in Saint Petersburg in 1913. It was based on his earlier S-21 Russky Vityaz, which started out as the twin-engined Le Grand, then as the twin tandem-engined Bolshoi Baltisky before placing all four of the Baltisky's engines in a tractor configuration along the lower wing's leading edge to create the Russky Vityaz — which had played an important role in the development of Russian aviation and the multi-engine aircraft industries of the world.

The Ilya Muromets was first conceived and built as a luxurious aircraft. For the first time in aviation history, it had an insulated passenger saloon, comfortable wicker chairs, a bedroom, a lounge and even the first airborne toilet. The aircraft also had heating and electrical lighting.  The S-22 cockpit had sufficient space allowing several persons to observe the pilot. Openings on both sides of the fuselage permitted mechanics to climb out onto the lower wings to service the engines during flight.  A hatch on the left side provided an entry to the main cabin, behind the cockpit. The main cabin featured two large windows on each side. Further back was a private cabin which included a berth, small table and a cabinet. Lighting was provided by a wind-driven generator and heating was supplied by two long engine exhaust pipes which passed through the corners of the cabin. Despite many advancements, the flight instruments on the Ilya Muromets were primitive. They included four tachometers, one per engine, a compass, a crude altimeter and airspeed indicator, two glass U-shaped tubes and a ball for bank indication, and a series of horizontal bars situated vertically on the nose of the fuselage for measuring climbs and descents. Later, in the bomber variants, a drift indicator and elementary bombsight was added to aid bombing.

In 1913 the Ilya Muromets No. 107 flew for the first time, and on 11 February 1914, the second prototype (factory airframe 128) took off for its first demonstration flight with 16 passengers aboard, marking a record for number of passengers carried. From 30 June to 12 July 1914, it set a world record by making a trip from Saint Petersburg to Kiev, a distance of some 1200 km, and back. The first leg took 14 hours and 38 minutes, with one landing for fuel at Orsha, and the return one, with a fuel stop at Novosokolniki, took even less time, about 13 hours.  According to Sikorsky, "The  flight proved conclusively the value of large multi-motored airplanes. The Army placed an order for ten four-engined airplanes of the Ilia Mourometz type and the factory personnel was overjoyed by this final approval of the results of two years of hard work."  The acclaim received by Sikorsky included Tsar Nicholas II presenting him with the Order of St. Vladimir, Fourth Degree, arranging for an exemption from the wartime draft to allow him to continue his design work, and a promise of a grant worth 100,000 rubles from the State Duma.  During an Imperial military review at Krasnoye Selo in July, Nicholas II decorated and christened the Ilya Muromets Type B Military Prototype, No. 128, the "Kievsky."

During testing, the Ilya Muromets were fitted with both skis and pontoons in anticipation of new variants being produced. If it had not been for World War I, the Ilya Muromets would probably have started passenger flights that same year.

With the beginning of World War I, Sikorsky was encouraged by the results of the proving flights to redesign the aircraft to become the "Military Ilia Mourometz, Type V, the world's first purpose-designed heavier than air bomber.  The new heavy bomber was slightly smaller and lighter than the Type A. Internal racks carried up to 800 kg of bombs, and positions for up to nine machine guns were added for self-defense in various locations, including the extreme tail. The Muromets (in its S-25 Geh-2 variant, March 1916) was the first aircraft in history to incorporate a tail gunner position. The engines were protected with 5 mm-thick armor. The military version was designed expressly for long-range flying in both bombing and reconnaissance roles.

Operational history 

When WWI broke out, only two Ilya Muromets bombers were completed out of an initial production run of ten aircraft. In August 1914, the Ilya Muromets was introduced to the Imperial Russian Air Service and on 10 December 1914, the Russians formed their first ten-bomber squadron, slowly increasing the number to 20 by mid-1916. Operations with the heavy bombers began on 12 February 1915 with a raid on German frontline positions.

German Fighter Pilots often were reluctant to attack Ilya Muromets in the air due to their defensive firepower including the unique tail gun position, and the difficulty in bringing down such a large aircraft. Once engaged, small fighters also found that they were buffeted by propeller wash of the four large engines.

On 12 September 1916 (Julian calendar), the Russians lost their first Ilya Muromets in a fight with four German Albatros, three of which it managed to shoot down. This was also the only loss to enemy action during the war; three others were damaged in combat, but managed to return to base to be repaired.

83 Ilya Muromets bombers were built for the Russian forces between 1913 and 1918. They recorded a number of firsts in the history of military aviation, like bombing from heavy bombers, performing bomber group raids on enemy targets, night bombing, and photographic bomb damage assessment. They were also the first to develop defensive tactics for a single bomber engaged in an air combat with several enemy fighters. Due to systematic weapon upgrades, the effectiveness of bomb-dropping reached 90%.

The Ilya Muromets performed more than 400 sorties and dropped 65 tons of bombs during the war. By 1917, attrition from constant flying had reduced the bombing fleet substantially and only four bombers remained at the front line; the other Ilya Muromets were relegated to trainer duties.  The heavy bombers of other participants appeared in 1916, all resembling the Russian pioneer to a certain degree.  The Russian government and Sikorsky himself sold the design and production license to the British and French governments. The Germans tried to copy its design, using the fragments of the Ilya Muromets they had shot down over their territory in September 1916. By the end of 1916, the design was generally believed to be at the end of its development cycle, with ensuing modifications to individual aircraft, such as additional armor and weapons, making the aircraft too heavy and not suitable for operational use. Continual changes in the field as well as the factory led to many aircraft being redesignated as a new variant.  Further designs based on the original Ilya Muromets bombers included a more dedicated attack version.

Russian Revolution and aftermath 
Following the February Revolution of 1917, the Ilya Muromets bombers continued to fly with the Russian Imperial Army but others were seized by the provisional government with pilots also defecting to the Ukrainian squadron of Hetman and General Pavlo Skoropadsky, with at least one Ilya Muromets being flown by Polish forces. The remainder of the aircraft flew with the Red Army until mid-1919.

The Ilya Muromets continued in production after the war, with only a handful being finished. From May–October 1921, the aircraft was utilized in its originally intended role of passenger transport on the Moscow-Kharkov line; six saw service as a civilian passenger airliner and mail plane.  After carrying 60 passengers and two tons of freight, the Ilya Muromets were considered too difficult to maintain as engines and airframes were worn out and on 10 October 1922, the airliners were retired. The last flight of an Ilya Muromets bomber took place in 1922 at the Air Shooting and Bomb-dropping School in Serpukhov.

Variants

 Ilya Muromets No. 107
 Experimental airliner, 1913; fitted with four  Argus As I engines, later refitted with two  Salmson 2M7 and two Argus 115 hp engines.
 Ilya Muromets No. 107 Hydroplane
 Hydroplane modification of airframe No. 107, fitted with two  Salmson 2M7 and two Argus 115 hp engines.
 Ilya Muromets Kievsky No. 128
 Experimental airliner, 1914; fitted with two Argus 140 hp engines and two Argus 125 hp engines.
 Ilya Muromets S-22 Type A
 Unarmed trainer, one built 1913, used in Gachina Air School in 1914
 Ilya Muromets S-23 Type B(eh) Bomber
 Bomber. First flight: 1914, in service August 1914, original armament: one 37mm cannon, one 8 mm machine gun; six built (heavily modified).
Type B No 135, 1914; fitted with four Argus engines of 130 hp each.
Type B No 136, 1914; fitted with two Salmson engines of 200 hp each and two Salmson engines of 136 hp each.
Type B No 137, 1914; fitted with two Salmson engines of 200 hp each and two Salmson engines of 136 hp each.
Type B No 138, 1914; fitted with two Salmson engines of 200 hp each and two Salmson engines of 136 hp each.
Type B No 139, 1914; fitted with two Salmson engines of 200 hp each and two Salmson engines of 136 hp each.
 Ilya Muromets S-23 V(eh) Series
 Bomber, First flight 1914, fitted with four Sunbeam Crusader V-8 engines of 148 hp each
Type V No 151, 1915; fitted with four Argus engines of 140 hp each.
Type V No 159 Trainer aircraft, 1915; fitted with two Sunbeam 225 hpV-8 engines.
Type V No 167, 1915; fitted with four RBVZ-6 engines of 150 hp each.
 Ilya Muromets S-24 G-1 Series
Bomber, First flight 1914; 18 built.
 Ilya Muromets S-25 Series
 Bomber, First flight 1915; 55 built.
 Ilya Muromets S-25 G-2 "Russobalt"
 Bomber, fitted with four RBVZ-6 engines of 150 hp, 170 kg bombload, five MG.
 Ilya Muromets S-25 G-3 "Renobalt" Series
 Bomber, fitted with two Renault engines of 220 hp each and two RBVZ-6 engines of 150 hp, 190 kg bombload, six MG
 Ilya Muromets S-26 D-1 DIM Series
 Bomber, First flight 1916, fitted with four Sunbeam engines of 150 hp; three built.
 Ilya Muromets S-27 E (Yeh-2) Series
 Bomber, First flight 1916, fitted with four Renault engines of 220 hp each; two built.

Operators

Military
/
 Imperial Russian Air Service

 Soviet Air Forces

 Polish Air Force
 Ukrainian State
 Ukrainian Air Force

Civilian
 Soviet Union Civil Air Fleet

Replica

One Ilya Muromets S-22 replica exists in the Monino Air Force Museum near Moscow built in 1970.

Specifications (Ilya Muromets Type S-23 V)

See also
 List of Russian inventions

References

Notes

Citations

Bibliography

 Angelucci, Enzo. The Rand McNally Encyclopedia of Military Aircraft, 1914–1980. San Diego, California: The Military Press, 1983. .
 Cochrane, Dorothy and Von Hardesty. The Aviation Careers of Igor Sikorsky. Seattle, Washington: University of Washington Press, 1989. .
 Darcey, Alan, Thomas Kulikov and Victor Durkots. The Imperial Russian Air Service: Famous Pilots and Aircraft of World War I. Mountain View, California: Flying Machine Press, 1995. .
 Delear, Frank J. Igor Sikorsky: Three Careers in Aviation (Air & Space Series, No 24). New York: Bantam, 1992. 
 Durkota, Alan E.,  T. Darcey and V. Kulikov. The Imperial Russian Air Service: Famous Pilots and Aircraft of World War I. Boulder, Colorado: Flying Machines Press, 1995. .
 Finne, K. N. Igor Sikorsky: The Russian Years. Washington, D.C.: Smithsonian Books, 1987. .
 Finne, K. N. Русские воздушные богатыри И. Сикорского  (Russian Air Warriors: I. Sikorsky) (Russian). Moscow: AST, Harvest, 2005. 
 Lake, Jon. The Great Book of Bombers: The World's Most Important Bombers from World War I to the Present Day. St. Paul, Minnesota: MBI Publishing Company, 2002. .
 Mackworth-Praed, Ben. Aviation: The Pioneer Years. London: Studio Editions, 1996. .
 Massenkov, Vladamir I., Boris Urinovski and Vadim I. Suvorov. Russia in ICAO to the 50th Anniversary of ICAO. Moscow: 1994. No ISBN.
 Miller, Russell. The Soviet Air Force at War. Alexandria, Virginia: Time-Life books, 1983. .
 Pember, Harry. Sikorsky Aircraft: From a Vision to Reality and Beyond. Stratford, Connecticut: Sikorsky Aircraft Corporation, 1999. No ISBN.
 Roustam-Bek-Tageev, LCol Boris. Aerial Russia: The Romance of The Giant Aeroplane. Austin, Texas: Alexander Palace Time Machine (Bob Atchison), 2011, Internet reprint of original 1917 edition.
 Sikorsky, Igor. Story of the Winged-S: An Autobiography by Igor Sikorsky. New York: Dodd, Mead & Company, 1938. No ISBN.
 Sikorsky, Sergei I. The Sikorsky Legacy (Images of Aviation). Charleston, South Carolina: Acadia Publishing, 2007. .
 Taylor, John W. R. Jane's Fighting Aircraft of World War I. London: Studio Editions, Reprint 2001. .
 Winchester, Jim. "Sikorsky Ilya Muromets." Biplanes, Triplanes and Seaplanes (Aviation Factfile). London: Grange Books plc, 2004. .
 Woodman, Harry. Sikorsky Ilya Muromets Type Veh, (Windsock Datafile Special No.3 – Classics of WW1 Aviation Volume 3). Berkhamsted, Herts, UK: Albatros Productions Limited, 2000. .

External links

 WWI Russian Bombers 
 some data on an Ilya Muromets
 Reconstruction of an Ilya Muromets 
 Image of a scale model
 Sikorsky Ilya Muromets (Series) Bomber/Reconnaissance Aircraft
 
 
 

1910s Russian bomber aircraft
Ilya Muromets
Military aircraft of World War I
Russian inventions
RBVZ aircraft
Four-engined tractor aircraft
Biplanes
Aircraft first flown in 1914
Four-engined piston aircraft